The Institute of Cost Accountants of India (ICMAI), which was also known as The Institute of Cost & Works Accountants of India (ICWAI) is a professional accountancy body in India. It is under the ownership of Ministry of Corporate Affairs of the Government of India. It has as its prime responsibility (by the Ministry of Corporate Affairs) to contribute to the cost and management accounting profession at the global level.

History 

The Institute of Cost Accountants of India was first formed as a registered limited company on 14 June 1944 as per the provisions of the  Companies Act of 1913. Post Independence, the institute got statutory recognition when the Parliament of India enacted "The Cost and Works Accountants Act" (Act No.23rd of 1959), a special act, on 28 May 1959 to accord statutory recognition to ICMAI (previously ICWAI) as an autonomous professional Institute.

The CWA Amendment bill of 2011 was passed by both the Houses of Indian Parliament. Lok Sabha and the Rajya Sabha on 12 December 2011 and assented by the president of India on 12 January 2012. The changes were published in the Official Gazette of India on 13 January 2012. As of now, there are a total of 85,000 active members of ICMAI.

International affiliations 

The ICMAI is a Founding Member of the International Federation of Accountants (IFAC), Confederation of Asian and Pacific Accountants (CAPA) and South Asian Federation of Accountants (SAFA). ICMAI is a member of the National Foundation of Corporate Governance (NFCG).

Qualification and syllabus 

This is the primary qualification of the ICMAI following completion of up to three levels (Foundation, Intermediate, and Final) examinations and three years of practical training in areas like Management Accounting, Cost Accounting, Financial Accounting, Taxation, Cost audits, GST audits, Internal audit, Corporate laws, etc. and enables an individual to become a CMA (Cost & Management Accountant).

 The Institute has introduced new Syllabus 2022 which fulfills the requirements of the new 2020 education policy and has increased the level of skill development and improved Course Learning objectives
 The old syllabus was introduced in August 2016 following the International Education Guidelines (IEG) of IFAC to get the advantages in the process of Mutual Recognition Agreement (MRA) among different member countries of the world under GATS in WTO.
 Subjects for examinations include Corporate Financial Reporting, Management Accounting, Financial Accounting, Strategic Management, Taxation, Corporate Law, Financial Management, Business Valuation, Cost & Management Audit, and Operations Management, etc.
 Students who have passed the degree examination of any recognized university or equivalent are eligible for admission directly to the Intermediate Level.
 Paper-wise exemptions on the basis of reciprocal arrangement are available to students who have passed Institute of Company Secretaries of India Final Examinations.
 Examinations are held twice a year, in June and December, in various examination centers in India and overseas centers. The results are declared in August and February for the June term and December term exams respectively.

Notable alumni 

Mrityunjay Athreya, Padma Bhushan, management advisor 
Subhash Chandra Garg, finance secretary, government of India
Chanda Kochhar, former CEO, ICICI Bank
J Ramachandran, professor, IIMB
P. K. Mukherjee, executive director of Sesa Sterlite Limited
Samir Bhatia, entrepreneur
Kailasam Raghavendra Rao, entrepreneur
B. B. Chakrabarti, professor 
G. J. R. Krishnan, musician
Sanjay Subrahmanyam
T. V. Somanathan, finance secretary, Government of India
Sadanand Date, IPS, Government of India

References 

Member bodies of the International Federation of Accountants
Accounting in India
Management accounting
Professional associations based in India
Organisations based in Kolkata
Educational boards based in Kolkata
1959 establishments in West Bengal
Organizations established in 1959